Russell Byrd (born March 4, 1992) is an American professional basketball player for the St. John's Edge of the NBL Canada. He played college basketball for Michigan State.

College career
On May 21, 2014 Byrd announced he would transfer from Michigan State to Master's College in California.

Professional career
On January 18, 2018 Byrd was traded to the St. John's Edge.

On July 23, 2018, Byrd signed a two-year contract with the Island Storm. It was the first multi-year deal in franchise history.

References 

Living people
1992 births
Michigan State Spartans men's basketball players
Basketball players from Indiana
American expatriate basketball people in Canada
Island Storm players
American men's basketball players
American expatriate basketball people in Spain
St. John's Edge players
KW Titans players
Moncton Magic players
Point guards